The Wheeler-Schebler Trophy Race was an automobile race held at the Indianapolis Motor Speedway in each of the two years prior to the first Indianapolis 500.  The trophy was sponsored by the Wheeler-Schebler Carburetor Company.  Frank Wheeler, one of the four co-founders of the Speedway, was also the president and co-founder of Wheeler-Schebler.  The 1909 race was originally scheduled for 300 miles, but was ended at 235 miles due to deteriorating track conditions.

Race results

Wheeler-Schebler Trophy in later years
In 1911, the Indianapolis Motor Speedway management ceased holding multiple racing events per year, in favor of a single major race annually – the Indianapolis 500. As a result, the Wheeler-Schebler Trophy race was discontinued.

In 1914 the trophy reappeared, now as an award given to the owner of the car leading the Indianapolis 500 at the 400-mile mark (lap 160). On numerous occasions, the leader at lap 160 went on to win the race. For the 1916 race only, the trophy was presented to the leader at lap 100 (250 miles) since the race was scheduled for only 300 miles.

The trophy was retired and given permanently to car owner Harry Hartz after his cars claimed the trophy in three consecutive years (1930, 1931, 1932). The original rules in 1909 stipulated that the trophy became the permanent possession of the individual to win it three times. Many years later, in 1956, the trophy was re-acquired by the Indianapolis Motor Speedway Museum.

Trophy winners (1914–1932)
1914: Louis Delâge (Rene Thomas) Race winner
1915: E.C. Patterson (Ralph DePalma) Race winner
1916: Peugeot Auto Racing Co. (Dario Resta) Race winner
1919: Howdy Wilcox (Howdy Wilcox) Race winner
1920: Ralph DePalma (Ralph DePalma) finished 5th
1921: Louis Chevrolet (Tommy Milton) Race winner
1922: Jimmy Murphy (Jimmy Murphy) Race winner
1923: Harry C. Stutz (Tommy Milton) Race winner
1924: Earl Cooper (Earl Cooper) finished 2nd
1925: Cliff Durant (Dave Lewis) finished 2nd
1926: Peter Kreis (Frank Lockhart) Race winner
1927: Cooper Engineering Co. (Bob McDonogh/Pete DePaolo) finished 6th
1928: J. R. Burgamy (Tony Gulotta) finished 10th
1929: Maude "M. A." Yagle (Ray Keech) Race winner
1930: Harry Hartz (Billy Arnold) Race winner
1931: Harry Hartz (Billy Arnold) finished 19th
1932: Harry Hartz (Fred Frame) Race winner

References

Scott, D. Bruce; INDY: Racing Before the 500; Indiana Reflections; 2005; .
Galpin, Darren;  A Record of Motorsport Racing Before World War I.
1909 AAA National Championship Trail
1910 AAA National Championship Trail

Auto races in the United States
Motorsport in Indianapolis
BorgWarner